Graphosia is a genus of moths in the family Erebidae. The genus was erected by George Hampson in 1900.

Species
 Graphosia approximans Rothschild, 1912
 Graphosia bilineata Hampson, 1900
 Graphosia lophopyga (Turner, 1940)
 Graphosia ochracea (Bethune-Baker, 1904)
 Graphosia pachygramma Hampson, 1914
 Graphosia phaeocraspis Bethune-Baker, 1908
 Graphosia polylophota Hampson, 1914
 Graphosia stenopepla Hampson, 1914

References

Lithosiina
Moth genera